CrossGenesis was the first ever CrossGen comic book. Its purpose was to give readers a first look into the world that would become popularly known as the Sigilverse.

2000 comics debuts